Ziesar is a town in the Potsdam-Mittelmark district, in Brandenburg, Germany.

Demography

Local council
Following local elections held on 26 May 2019:
 SPD 5 seats
 CDU 4 seats
 Freie Bürger und Bauern (FBB) (Free citizens and farmers) 3 seats

Pictures

History
During the Cold War the Western Allies considered Ziesar, specifically Exit 76 from Autobahn 2,  the halfway point of the transit route between West Berlin and "mainland" West Germany.  Road patrols offering breakdown services and assistance with DDR and Soviet authorities to Allied travelers were provided by Americans based in Berlin east of Ziesar and by the British detachment at Helmstedt west of it.

Sons and daughters of Ziesar

 Johannes Aepinus (1499-1553), theologian and church reformer
 Paul Schneider (1863-1946), the secret war councilor, farmer and the last private owner of Castle Ziesar from 1917 to 1945

Other personalities associated with Ziesar
 Wilhelm Kuhnert (1865-1926), painter

References

Fläming Heath
Localities in Potsdam-Mittelmark